Avinode Group is a Swedish B2B technology company focused on business aviation. It is known for operating Avinode Marketplace, an online marketplace for private air charter.

History 
Avinode was founded in 2002 by three graduates of Chalmers University of Technology, Niklas Berg, Per Marthinsson and Niclas Wennerholm. At this point in time, operators and brokers relied primarily on phone calls and fax to source and schedule aircraft. Berg, Marthinsson, and Wennerholm created an online marketplace, called the Avinode Marketplace, which quickly gained traction. In 2010, Avinode acquired its US marketplace competitor, CharterX. As of 2018, an average of 7,000 aviation professionals use the system daily, approximately 3,200 aircraft are listed in the marketplace, and nearly 300,000 flight requests are processed monthly. Roughly 80% of professionals in the business aviation industry use Avinode Group products.

Suite of applications 
Avinode Group consists of three applications serving different groups and purposes with business aviation.
 Avinode connects the services of operators and brokers globally, enabling buyers to search for trips, request quotes and communicate with sellers.
 SchedAero, web-based software for fleet operations, was launched in 2012. SchedAero serves operators and private flight departments as an online system for aircraft and crew scheduling, quoting, regulatory compliance,  and aircraft maintenance.
 Paynode, launched in 2016, is a digital payment platform developed specifically for the air charter industry.

References 

2002 establishments in Sweden
Aviation organizations based in Sweden